Chambers County is a county located in the east central portion of the U.S. state of Alabama.  As of the 2020 census the population was 34,772. Its county seat is LaFayette.  Its largest city is Valley. Its name is in honor of Henry H. Chambers, who served as a United States Senator from Alabama.

Chambers County is included in the LaGrange, GA Micropolitan Statistical Area and the Atlanta–Athens-Clarke–Sandy Springs Combined Statistical Area.

History
Prior to contact with people of European descent, what is now Chambers County was inhabited by the Creek nation.

Chambers County was established on December 18, 1832.

Pat Garrett, the lawman famed for killing outlaw Billy the Kid, was born near the town of Cusseta in 1850.

Joe Louis "The Brown Bomber", renowned heavyweight boxing champion, was born near LaFayette, on Buckalew Mountain, May 13, 1914.

In 1980, Chambers County joined its four mill villages to make the city of Valley. Today, it is the largest city in the county.

Geography

Major highways
 Interstate 85
 U.S. Highway 29
 U.S. Highway 280
 U.S. Highway 431
 State Route 50
 State Route 77
 State Route 147

Adjacent counties
Randolph County (north)
Troup County, Georgia (east/EST Border)
Harris County, Georgia (southeast/EST Border)
Lee County (south)
Tallapoosa County (west)

Demographics

2020

As of the 2020 United States census, there were 34,772 people, 13,448 households, and 8,553 families residing in the county.

2010
At the 2010 census there were 34,215 people, 13,933 households, and 9,391 families living in the county.  The population density was 57 people per square mile (22/km2). There were 17,004 housing units at an average density of 28 per square mile (11/km2).  The racial makeup of the county was 58.8% White (non-Hispanic), 38.7% Black or African American, 0.2% Native American, 0.5% Asian, 0.6% from other races, and 1.1% from two or more races.  1.6% of the population were Hispanic or Latino of any race.
Of the 13,933 households 24.6% had children under the age of 18 living with them, 42.6% were married couples living together, 19.1% had a female householder with no husband present, and 32.6% were non-families. 29.1% of households were one person and 12.3% were one person aged 65 or older. The average household size was 2.42 and the average family size was 2.97.

The age distribution was 22.5% under the age of 18, 8.1% from 18 to 24, 24.1% from 25 to 44, 28.7% from 45 to 64, and 16.7% 65 or older.  The median age was 41.5 years. For every 100 females there were 91.7 males. For every 100 females age 18 and over, there were 94.7 males.

The median household income was $31,467 and the median family income  was $39,475. Males had a median income of $34,176 versus $29,140 for females. The per capita income for the county was $16,626.  About 16.4% of families and 20.3% of the population were below the poverty line, including 30.2% of those under age 18 and 15.7% of those age 65 or over.

2000
At the 2000 census there were 36,583 people, 14,522 households, and 10,194 families living in the county.  The population density was 61 people per square mile (24/km2).  There were 16,256 housing units at an average density of 27 per square mile (11/km2).  The racial makeup of the county was 56.88% White (non-Hispanic), 43.11% Black or African American, 0.13% Native American, 0.19% Asian, 0.12% from other races, and 0.57% from two or more races.  3.7% of the population were Hispanic or Latino of any race.
Of the 14,522 households 29.30% had children under the age of 18 living with them, 48.50% were married couples living together, 17.40% had a female householder with no husband present, and 29.80% were non-families. 27.00% of households were one person and 12.40% were one person aged 65 or older.  The average household size was 2.48 and the average family size was 3.01.

The age distribution was 24.60% under the age of 18, 8.60% from 18 to 24, 27.00% from 25 to 44, 23.50% from 45 to 64, and 16.20% 65 or older.  The median age was 38 years. For every 100 females there were 89.60 males.  For every 100 females age 18 and over, there were 85.30 males.

The median household income was $29,667 and the median family income  was $36,598. Males had a median income of $28,771 versus $21,159 for females. The per capita income for the county was $15,147.  About 14.30% of families and 17.00% of the population were below the poverty line, including 22.50% of those under age 18 and 18.20% of those age 65 or over.

Education 
Chambers County contains two public school districts. There are approximately 4,350 students in public PK-12 schools in Chambers County.

Districts 
School districts include:

 Chambers County School District
 Lanett City School District

Government
Chambers is a Republican-leaning county, although it has a sufficient Black minority to return a respectable Democratic vote. The last Democrat to win a majority in the county was Jimmy Carter in 1980, although Bill Clinton won pluralities in it in both 1992 and 1996.

Communities

Cities

 LaFayette (County Seat)
 Lanett
 Valley

Towns

 Cusseta
 Five Points
 Waverly (Partly in Lee County)

Census-designated places

 Abanda
 Fredonia
 Huguley
 Penton
 Standing Rock

Unincorporated communities

 Milltown
 Oak Bowery
 Oakland
 Red Level
 Stroud
 Welch
 White Plains

Ghost town
 Cedric

In popular culture
Chambers County has been the backdrop of several movies including Mississippi Burning.

See also
National Register of Historic Places listings in Chambers County, Alabama
Properties on the Alabama Register of Landmarks and Heritage in Chambers County, Alabama

References

External links
Official county website
Greater Valley Area Chamber of Commerce

 

 
1832 establishments in Alabama
Populated places established in 1832
Counties of Appalachia